Marshall J. Quinton  (1852–1904) was a professional baseball catcher. He played in the American Association for the 1884 Richmond Virginians  and 1885 Philadelphia Athletics. He played in the minors from 1877 to 1889.

External links

1852 births
1904 deaths
Major League Baseball catchers
Baseball players from Philadelphia
Richmond Virginians players
Philadelphia Athletics (AA) players
19th-century baseball players
London Tecumsehs (baseball) players
Guelph Maple Leafs players
Philadelphia Phillies (minor league) players
Richmond Virginians (minor league) players
Trenton Trentonians players
Oswego Sweegs players
Rochester Flour Cities players
Oneida Indians players
Cobleskill Giants players